Galeandra dives is a species of orchid. It is native to Costa Rica, French Guiana, Guyana, Suriname, Venezuela and Colombia.

References

dives
Orchids of South America
Orchids of Costa Rica
Plants described in 1854